The 1953 Canadian federal election was held on August 10, 1953 to elect members  of the House of Commons of Canada of the 22nd Parliament of Canada. Prime Minister Louis St. Laurent led his Liberal Party of Canada to its second consecutive majority government, although the party lost seats to the other parties.

The Progressive Conservative Party, led by former Premier of Ontario, George Drew, formed the official opposition. However, for the last time until 1993, the party was unable to win the popular vote in any of Canada's provinces or territories.

This was the last election until 1988 in which any party won back-to-back majorities, and the last until 1997 in which the Liberals would accomplish this feat.

National results 

Notes:

* - not applicable - the party was not recognized in the previous election

x - less than 0.005% of the popular vote

1 The Liberal-Labour MP sat with the Liberal caucus.

Results by province 

xx - less than 0.05% of the popular vote

See also
 
List of Canadian federal general elections
List of political parties in Canada
22nd Canadian Parliament

References

Further reading 
 
 
 

 
 Federal
1953
August 1953 events in Canada